Lackawanna College (Lackawanna or LC) is a private college in Scranton, Pennsylvania. It also has satellite centers in Hazleton, Hawley, Sunbury, Towanda, and Tunkhannock, and an Environmental Education Center in Covington Township.

Academics

The private four-year college has evolved with an open admissions policy and enrolls approximately 1,991 students.

While the college offers a variety of traditional academic programs, many of its popular majors are centered on vocations, such as law enforcement, culinary arts, and accounting. Lackawanna has invested in several Health Sciences programs including Cardiac Sonography, Diagnostic Medical Sonography, Vascular Technology, Physical Therapist Assistant, Occupational Therapy Assistant, and Surgical Technology. Lackawanna has established transfer agreements with a number of colleges in Pennsylvania and is part of the state's academic passport system.

Industry-specific degrees were created at the School of Petroleum and Natural Gas to fill the demand of the Marcellus Shale career opportunities in the work force. According to "Petroleum-schools.com", Lackawanna College ranks seventh in Pennsylvania among top academic petroleum programs. Those programs were moved to the college's new Tunkhannock Center upon its opening in the Fall 2021 semester.

Lackawanna College also operates police academies at its Scranton campus and Hazleton Center. The academy was originally certified by the Commonwealth of Pennsylvania through the Municipal Police Officers’ Education and Training Commission in Harrisburg, on April 21, 1977. Lackawanna is the first and continues to be the only private college in Northeastern Pennsylvania authorized to provide police education and training.

As of July 1, 2020, Lackawanna's president is Dr. Jill Murray, who succeeded former Lackawanna College president Colonel Mark Volk. The college is accredited by the Middle States Commission on Higher Education.

Notable alumni
 Mike Balogun, former professional football player, Buffalo Bills, Dallas Cowboys, Tampa Bay Buccaneers, and Washington Redskins
 Jaquan Brisker, professional football player, Chicago Bears
 Jermaine Eluemunor, professional football player, Las Vegas Raiders
 Mark Glowinski, professional football player, New York Giants
 Bryant McKinnie, former professional football player, Baltimore Ravens, Miami Dolphins, and Minnesota Vikings
 Bob Mellow, former President pro tempore of the Pennsylvania Senate 
 Gale H. Stalker, former U.S. Congressman from New York
 Lorenzo Taliaferro, former professional football player, Baltimore Ravens
 Emmanuel Ubilla, professional basketball player, BK NH Ostrava
 Kevin White, former professional football player, Chicago Bears, New Orleans Saints, and San Francisco 49ers
 Kyzir White, professional football player, Arizona Cardinals

References

External links
 Official website
 Official athletics website

 
1912 establishments in Pennsylvania
Education in Susquehanna County, Pennsylvania
Education in Wayne County, Pennsylvania
Garden State Athletic Conference
Educational institutions established in 1912
NJCAA athletics
Private universities and colleges in Pennsylvania
Scranton, Pennsylvania
Two-year colleges in the United States
Universities and colleges in Lackawanna County, Pennsylvania
Universities and colleges in Luzerne County, Pennsylvania